The 2008 Congressional election for the Delegate from the United States Virgin Islands was held on November 4, 2008.

The non-voting delegate to the United States House of Representatives from the United States Virgin Islands is elected for two-year terms. The winner of the race will serve in the 111th Congress from January 3, 2009 until January 3, 2011.  The election coincided with the 2008 U.S. presidential election.

Candidates 
Incumbent U.S. Virgin Islands Delegate Donna Christian-Christensen announced that she intended to seek a fourth term in the United States House of Representatives.  Her announcement of her decision to seek re-election came in a press conference held at her congressional district office in Sunny Isle, United States Virgin Islands, on January 10, 2008.

Christensen, who has held the seat since 1996, easily won re-election in the previous contest in 2006.  She received 66% of the vote in 2006, in contrast to her nearest rival, Warren Mosler, who garnered 29% of the vote.

Christensen ran unopposed in the 2008 Congressional election.  This all but guaranteed her successful re-election to the House of Representatives. As such, Christensen was re-elected again with over 99% of the popular vote.

Results

References 

United States House of Representatives
United States Virgin Islands
2008